is a Japanese actress and voice actress affiliated with Atomic Monkey. She was born in Kanagawa Prefecture, Japan. She was originally a child actress.

She appears in the Japanese and English-language versions of the Pokémon anime, voicing Ash's Caterpie, Metapod and Butterfree and his Krabby. She had a main role in the Orange League series where she voiced Ash's Lapras in both versions. She also appeared in the second Pokémon movie as the legendary Fire Pokémon, Moltres. She had a recurring role in the Johto series as Charla, Liza's female Charizard, a Pokémon who lives at the Charicific Valley and who eventually developed a romantic relationship with Ash's Charizard. She also played Madame Muchmoney's Granbull.

She is also known as a specialist of tongue-twisters in the Japanese language.

Filmography

Television animation

Animated Films

Original video animations

Tokusatsu
 Kamen Rider J (1994 TV special) – Berry (voice)
Kamen Rider World (1994 TV special) – Berry (voice)
 Bakuryū Sentai Abaranger (CD Special) – Trinoid 23: Alohibiscuskunk (voice)

Video games

Dubbing roles 
 A Cinderella Story – Fiona (Jennifer Coolidge)
 The Fifth Element (1999 NTV edition) – Leeloo (Milla Jovovich)
 Harry Potter and the Deathly Hallows – Part 2 – Helena Ravenclaw (Kelly Macdonald)

References

External links 
 Official agency profile 
 Rikako Aikawa at GamePlaza-Haruka Voice Acting Database 
 Rikako Aikawa at Hitoshi Doi's Seiyuu Database
 

1967 births
Living people
Japanese child actresses
Japanese video game actresses
Japanese voice actresses
Voice actresses from Kanagawa Prefecture